16 Pashons - Coptic calendar - 18 Pashons

Fixed commemorations
All fixed commemorations below are observed on 17 Pashons (25 May) by the Coptic Orthodox Church.

Saints
Saint Epiphanius, Bishop of Salamis in Cyprus (403 A.D.)

References
Coptic Synexarion

Days of the Coptic calendar